Congustus or Kongoustos, also known as Congussus, was a town of ancient Lycaonia or of Galatia, inhabited in Roman and Byzantine times. The Tabula Peutingeriana has the place as Congusso.

Its site is located near Altınekin, Konya Province, Turkey.

References

Populated places in ancient Lycaonia
Populated places in ancient Galatia
Former populated places in Turkey
Roman towns and cities in Turkey
Populated places of the Byzantine Empire
History of Konya Province